Alexander Alexandrovich Nikishin (born 2 October 2001) is a Russian professional ice hockey defenseman currently playing for SKA Saint Petersburg in the Kontinental Hockey League (KHL).

Playing career
Nikishin made his KHL debut for HC Spartak Moskva during the 2019–20 season.  He was drafted by the Carolina Hurricanes in the 3rd round of the 2020 NHL Entry Draft with the 69th overall pick.

Following three seasons in the KHL with Spartak Moscow, Nikishin was traded to powerhouse club SKA Saint Petersburg in exchange for 5 contracted players and the rights to four further players and an additional 50 million rubles on 31 July 2022.

International play

On 23 January 2022, Nikishin was named to the roster to represent Russian Olympic Committee athletes at the 2022 Winter Olympics.

Career statistics

Regular season and playoffs

International

References

External links
 

2001 births
Living people
Carolina Hurricanes draft picks
Ice hockey players at the 2022 Winter Olympics
Medalists at the 2022 Winter Olympics
Olympic silver medalists for the Russian Olympic Committee athletes
Olympic medalists in ice hockey
Olympic ice hockey players of Russia
People from Oryol
Russian ice hockey defencemen
SKA Saint Petersburg players
HC Spartak Moscow players
JHC Spartak players